The Speaker of the Arkansas House of Representatives is the speaker (presiding officer) of the Arkansas House of Representatives, the lower house of the Arkansas General Assembly. They serve as the leader and head of the Arkansas House, and can control what legislation comes to a vote. The Speaker's counterpart in the State Senate is the President of the Senate.

Position legacy
Some early Speakers went on to prominent political careers or leveraged the position into statewide positions. John Roane, James Berry, James P. Eagle and others became governor in the years after serving as Speaker. J. C. Tappan was twice nominated by the Democrats, but declined to run both times. Albert Rust and Lewis E. Sawyer became US Representatives.

In recent times, the Speaker has been a veteran member of the General Assembly.

List of speakers

See also
Governor of Arkansas

References

Bibliography

External links 
http://house.legis.state.ar.us/

 
Arkansas General Assembly
Speakers
Arkansas